Literacy in India is a key for social-economic progress. The 2011 census, indicated a 2001–2011 literacy growth of 97.2%, which is slower than the growth seen during the previous decade. An old analytical 1990 study estimated that it would take until 2060 for India to achieve universal literacy at then-current rate of progress.

Census of India pegged the average literacy rate to be 73% in 2011 while National Statistical Commission surveyed literacy to be 77.7% in 2017–18. Literacy rate in urban areas was 87.7%, higher than rural areas with 73.5%. There is a wide gender disparity in the literacy rate in India and effective literacy rates (age 7 and above) was 84.7% for men and 70.3% for women. The low female literacy rate has a dramatically negative impact on family planning and population stabillisation efforts in India. Studies have indicated that female literacy is a strong predictor of the use of contraception among married Indian couples, even when women do not otherwise have economic independence. The census provided a positive indication that growth in female literacy rates (11.8%) was substantially faster than in male literacy rates (6.9%) in the 2001–2011 decadal period, which means the gender gap appears to be narrowing.

Literacy involves a continuum of learning enabling individuals to achieve their goals, to develop their knowledge and potential, and to participate fully in their community and wider society."

The National Literacy Mission defines literacy as acquiring the skills of reading, writing and arithmetic and the ability to apply them to one's day-to-day life. The achievement of functional literacy implies (i) self-reliance in 3 R's, (ii) awareness of the causes of deprivation and the ability to move towards amelioration of their condition by participating in the process of development, (iii) acquiring skills to improve economic status and general well-being, and (iv) imbibing values such as national integration, conservation of the environment, women's equality, observance of small family norms.

The working definition of literacy in the Indian census since 1991 is as follows:

 Literacy rate
 Also called the "effective literacy rate"; the total percentage of the population of an area at a particular time aged seven years or above who can read and write with understanding. Here the denominator is the population aged seven years or more.
 
 Crude literacy rate The total percentage of the people of an area at a particular time who can read and write with understanding, taking the total population of the area (including below seven years of age) as the denominator.

Literacy Rate in India 

: The report on 'Household Social Consumption: Education in India as part of 75th round of National Sample Survey - from July 2017 to June 2018.

Comparative literacy statistics on country

The table below shows the adult and youth literacy rates for India and some neighboring countries in 2015.
Adult literacy rate is based on the 15+ years age group, while the youth literacy rate is for the 15–24 years age group (i.e. youth is a subset of adults).

Literacy rate disparity
One of the main factors contributing to this relatively low literacy rate is usefulness of education and availability of schools in vicinity in rural areas. There is a shortage of classrooms to accommodate all the students in 2006–2007. In addition, there is no proper sanitation in most schools. The study of 188 government-run primary schools in central and northern India revealed that 59% of the schools had no drinking water facility and 89% no toilets. In 600,000 villages and multiplying urban slum habitats, 'free and compulsory education' is the basic literacy instruction dispensed by barely qualified 'para teachers'. The average pupil teacher ratio for all India is 42:1, implying a teacher shortage. Such inadequacies resulted in a non-standardized school system where literacy rates may differ. Furthermore, the expenditure allocated to education was never above 4.3% of the GDP from 1951 to 2002 despite the target of 6% by the Kothari Commission. This further complicates the literacy problem in India.

Severe caste disparities also exist. Discrimination of lower castes has resulted in high dropout rates and low enrollment rates. The National Sample Survey Organisation and the National Family Health Survey collected data in India on the percentage of children completing primary school which are reported to be only 36.8% and 37.7% respectively. On 21 February 2005, the Prime Minister of India said that he was pained to note that "only 47 out of 100 children enrolled in class I reach class VIII, putting the dropout rate at 52.78 percent." It is estimated that at least 35 million, and possibly as many as 60 million, children aged 6–14 years are not in school.

The large proportion of illiterate females is another reason for the low literacy rate in India. Inequality based on gender differences resulted in female literacy rates being lower at 65.46% than that of their male counterparts at 82.14%. Due to strong stereotyping of female and male roles, sons are thought of to be more useful and hence are educated. Females are pulled to help out on agricultural farms at home as they are increasingly replacing the males on such activities which require no formal education. Fewer than 2% of girls who engaged in agriculture work attended school.

Growth of literacy

Pre-colonial period
Prior to the colonial era, education in India typically occurred under the supervision of a guru in traditional schools called gurukulas. The gurukulas were supported by public donations and were one of the earliest forms of public school offices.

According to the work of historian Dharampal, based on British documents from the early 1800s, pre-colonial education in India was fairly universal. Dharampal noted that the Hindu temple and/or mosque of each village had a school attached to it and the children of all communities attended these schools.

British period
In the colonial era, the community-funded gurukul system and temple-based charity education, began to decline as the centrally funded institutions promoted by the British colonial administration began to gradually take over.

From 1881 and 1947, the number of English-language primary schools grew from 82,916 to 134,866 and the number of students attending those institutions grew from 2,061,541 to 10,525,943. Literacy rates among the Indian public, as recorded rose from an estimated 3.2 per cent in 1872, to 16.1 per cent in 1941.

In 1944, the British colonial administration presented a plan, called the Sargent Scheme for the educational reconstruction of India, with a goal of producing 100% literacy in the country within 40 years, i.e. by 1984. Although the 40-year time-frame was derided at the time by leaders of the Indian independence movement as being too long a period to achieve universal literacy, India had only just crossed the 74% level by the 2011 census. The British Indian censuses identify a significant difference in literacy rates, by: sex, religion, caste and state of residence, e.g.:

Post-independence period

The provision of universal and compulsory education for all children in the age group of 6–14 was a cherished national ideal and had been given overriding priority by incorporation as a Directive Policy in Article 45 of the Constitution, but it is still to be achieved more than half a century since the Constitution was adopted in 1949. Parliament has passed the Constitution 86th Amendment Act, 2002, to make elementary education a Fundamental Right for children in the age group of 6–14 years. In order to provide more funds for education, an education cess of 2 percent has been imposed on all direct and indirect central taxes through the Finance (No. 2) Act, 2004.

In 2000–01, there were 60,840 pre-primary and pre-basic schools, and 664,041 primary and junior basic schools. Total enrolment at the primary level has increased from 19,200,000 in 1950–51 to 109,800,000 in 2001–02. The number of high schools in 2000–01 was higher than the number of primary schools at the time of independence.

The literacy rate grew from 18.33 percent in 1951, to 74.04 percent in 2011.  During the same period, the population grew from 361 million to 1,210 million.

Literacy rate variations between states
India's literacy rate is at 75%. Kerala has achieved a literacy rate of 93%. Bihar is the least literate state in India, with a literacy of 63.82%. Several other social indicators of the two states are correlated with these rates, such as life expectancy at birth (71.61 for males and 75 for females in Kerala, 65.66 for males and 64.79 for females in Bihar), infant mortality per 1,000 live births (10 in Kerala, 61 in Bihar), birth rate per 1,000 people (16.9 in Kerala, 30.9 in Bihar) and death rate per 1,000 people (6.4 in Kerala, 7.9 in Bihar).<ref name="nayar2005">{{Citation | title=Health Analysis – Kerala and Bihar: A Comparison |author1=K.R. Nayar |author2=Anant Kumar | date=July 2005 | journal= Yojana  |volume=49 | ssrn=1354541 | quote=... The inter-sectoral action needs to be recognized for achieving any health improvement in Bihar.}}</ref>

Every census since 1881 had indicated rising literacy in the country, but the population growth rate had been high enough that the absolute number of illiterate people rose with every decade. The 2001–2011 decade is the second census period (after the 1991–2001 census period) when the absolute number of Indian illiterate population declined (by 31,196,847 people), indicating that the literacy growth rate is now outstripping the population growth rate.

Six Indian states account for about 60% of all illiterates in India: Uttar Pradesh, Bihar, Madhya Pradesh, Rajasthan, and  Andhra Pradesh (including Telangana). Slightly less than half of all Indian illiterates (48.12%) are in the six states of Uttar Pradesh, Bihar, Rajasthan, Madhya Pradesh, Jharkhand and Chhattisgarh.

State Literacy Efforts
Several states in India have executed successful programs to boost literacy rates. Over time, a set of factors have emerged as being key to success: the official will to succeed, deliberate steps to engage the community in administering the program, adequate funding for infrastructure and teachers, and provisioning additional services which are considered valuable by the community (such as free school lunches).

Bihar
Bihar has significantly raised the literacy rate as per the 2011 census. Literacy rate in year 1951 was only 13.49%, 21.95% in year 1961, 23.17% in year 1971 and 32.32% in year 1981. The literacy rate has risen from 39% in 1991 to 47% in 2001 to 63.8% in 2011. The Government of Bihar has launched several programs to boost literacy, and its Department of Adult Education won a UNESCO award in 1981.

Extensive impoverishment, entrenched hierarchical social divisions and the lack of correlation between educational attainment and job opportunities are often cited in studies of the hurdles literacy programs face in Bihar. Children from "lower castes" are frequently denied school attendance and harassed when they do attend. In areas where there is  discrimination, poor funding and impoverished families means that children often cannot afford textbooks and stationery.

When children do get educated, general lack of economic progress in the state means that government jobs are the only alternative to farming labor, yet these jobs, in practice, require bribes to secure – which poorer families cannot afford. This leads to educated youths working on the farms, much as uneducated ones do, and leads parents to question the investment of sending children to school in the first place. Bihar's government schools have also faced teacher absenteeism, leading the state government to threaten to withhold of salaries of teachers who failed to conduct classes on a regular basis. To incentivize students to attend, the government announced a Rupee 1 per school-day grant to poor children who show up at school.

Tripura
Presently Tripura has the third highest literacy rate in India. According to the 2011 census, literacy level was 93.91 percent in Kerala and 91.58 percent in Mizoram, among the most literate states in the country. The national literacy rate, according to the 2011 census, was 74.04 percent.

The Tripura success story is attributed to the involvement of local government bodies, including gram panchayats, NGOs and local clubs under the close supervision of the State Literacy Mission Authority (SLMA) headed by the chief minister. Tripura attained 87.75 percent literacy in the 2011 census, from the 12th position in the 2001 census to the 4th position in the 2011 census. The Tripura Chief Minister said that efforts were underway to literate leftover 5.35 percent people and achieve complete success in a state of about 3.8 million people. The programs were not just implemented to make the state literate but as long-term education programs to ensure all citizens have a certain basic minimum level of education. Tripura has 45 blocks and 23 subdivisions that are served by 68 government-run schools and 30-40 private schools.

Among projects implemented by the state government to increase literacy in the state are:

 Total literacy drive for people aged between 15 and 50 who have lost the chance of entering formal education fold. A special program – titled improved pace and content learning (IPCL) – has been designed to provide basic education to such people.
 10,000 Anganwadi centers have 100 percent enrollment.
 Policy of no-fail till class VIII to prevent children from dropping out.
 Midday meals in all schools with an eclectic menu for all days of the week to attract more students.
 No tuition fee in government colleges.

The holistic education system, implemented with equal interest in Agartala, remote areas and the tribal autonomic areas makes sure that people in Tripura do not just become literate but educated, officials emphasized. One pointer to the government's interest in education is the near-total absence of child labor in Tripura. 

Kerala
Kerala topped the Education Development Index (EDI) among 21 major states in India in the year 2006–2007.[143] More than 94% of the rural population has access to a primary school within 1 km, while 98% of the population benefits one school within a distance of 2 km. An upper primary school within a distance of 3 km is available for more than 96% of the people, whose 98% benefit the facility for secondary education within 8 km. The access for rural students to higher educational institutions in cities is facilitated by widely subsidized transport fares.

Kerala's educational system has been developed by institutions owned or aided by the government. In the educational system prevailed in the state, schooling is for 10 years which is subdivided into lower primary, upper primary and high school. After 10 years of secondary schooling, students typically enroll in Higher Secondary Schooling in one of the three major streams— liberal arts, commerce or science. Upon completing the required coursework, students can enroll in general or professional undergraduate programs.

Kerala launched a "campaign for total literacy" in Ernakulam district in the late 1980s, with a "fusion between the district administration headed by its collector on one side and, on the other side, voluntary groups, social activists and others". On 4 February 1990, the Government of Kerala endeavoured to replicate the initiative on a statewide level, launching the Kerala State Literacy Campaign. First, households were surveyed with door-to-door, multistage survey visits to form an accurate picture of the literacy landscape and areas that needed special focus. Then, Kala Jāthas (cultural troupes) and Sāksharata Pada Yātras (Literacy Foot Marches) were organized to generate awareness of the campaign and create a receptive social atmosphere for the program. An integrated management system was created involving state officials, prominent social figures, local officials and senior voluntary workers to oversee the execution of the campaign.

Himachal

Himachal Pradesh underwent a "Schooling Revolution" in the 1961–2001 period that has been called "even more impressive than Kerala's." Kerala has led the nation in literacy rates since the 19th century and seen sustained initiatives for over 150 years, whereas Himachal Pradesh's literacy rate in 1961 was below the national average in every age group. In the three decadal 1961–1991 period, the female literacy in the 15–19 years age group went from 11% to 86%. School attendance for both boys and girls in the 6–14-year age group stood at over 97% each, when measured in the 1998–99 school year.

Mizoram
Mizoram is the second most literate state in India (91.58 percent), with Serchhip and Aizawl districts being the two most literate districts in India (literacy rate is 98.76% and 98.50%), both in Mizoram. Mizoram's literacy rate rose rapidly after independence: from 31.14% in 1951 to 88.80% in 2001. As in Himachal Pradesh, Mizoram has a social structure that is relatively free of hierarchy and strong official intent to produce total literacy. The government identified illiterates and organized an administrative structure that engaged officials and community leaders and manned by "animators" who were responsible for teaching five illiterates each. Mizoram established 360 continuing education centers to handle continued education beyond the initial literacy teaching and to provide an educational safety net for school drop-outs.

Tamil Nadu
One of the pioneers of the scheme that started providing cooked meals to children in corporation schools in the Madras city in 1923. The program was introduced on a large scale in the 1960s under the chief ministership of K. Kamaraj. The first major thrust came in 1982 when Chief Minister of Tamil Nadu, Dr. M. G. Ramachandran, decided to universalize the scheme for all children up to class 10. Tamil Nadu's midday meal program is among the best-known in the country. Starting in 1982, Tamil Nadu took an approach to promote literacy based on free lunches for schoolchildren, "ignoring cynics who said it was an electoral gimmick and economists who said it made little fiscal sense." The then chief minister of Tamil Nadu, MGR launched the program, which resembled a similar initiative in 19th century Japan, because "he had experienced as a child what it was like to go hungry to school with the family having no money to buy food".

Eventually, the program covered all children under the age of 15, as well as pregnant women for the first four months of their pregnancy. Tamil Nadu's literacy rate rose from 54.4% in 1981 to 80.3% in 2011. In 2001, the Supreme Court of India instructed all state governments to implement free school lunches in all government-funded schools, but implementation has been patchy due to corruption and social issues. Despite these hurdles, 120 million receive free lunches in Indian schools every day, making it the largest school meal program in the world.

Rajasthan
Although the decadal rise from 2001 to 2011 was only 6.7% (60.4% in 2001 to 67.7% in 2011), Rajasthan had the biggest percentage decadal (1991–2001) increase in the literacy of all Indian states, from about 38% to about 61%, a leapfrog that has been termed "spectacular" by some observers. Aggressive state government action, in the form of the District Primary Education Programme, the Shiksha Karmi initiative and the Lok Jumbish program are credited with the rapid improvement. Virtually every village in Rajasthan now has primary school coverage. When statehood was granted to Rajasthan in 1956, it was the least literate state in India with a literacy rate of 18%.

Literacy efforts
The right to education is a fundamental right, and UNESCO aimed at education for all by 2015. India, along with the Arab states and sub-Saharan Africa, has a literacy level below the threshold level of 75%, but efforts are ongoing to achieve that level. The campaign to achieve at least the threshold literacy level represents the largest ever civil and military mobilization in the country. International Literacy Day is celebrated each year on 8 September with the aim to highlight the importance of literacy to individuals, communities and societies.

Government efforts
Financial regulators in India such as RBI, SEBI, IRDAI, PFDRA, etc. have created a joint charter called National Strategy For Financial Education (NSFE), detailing initiatives taken by them for financial literacy in India. Also, other market participants like banks, stock exchanges, broking houses, mutual funds, and insurance companies are actively involved in it. The National Centre For Financial Education (NCFE) in consultation with relevant financial sector regulators and stakeholders has prepared the revised NSFE(2020-2025)

National Literacy Mission
The National Literacy Mission, launched in 1988, aimed at attaining a literacy rate of 75 percent by 2007. Its charter is to impart functional literacy to non-literates in the age group of 35–75 years. The Total Literacy Campaign is their principal strategy for the eradication of illiteracy. The Continuing Education Scheme provides a learning continuum to the efforts of the Total Literacy and Post Literacy programs.

Sarva Shiksha Abhiyan
The Sarva Shiksha Abhiyan (Hindi for Total Literacy Campaign) was launched in 2001 to ensure that all children in the 6–14-year age-group attend school and complete eight years of schooling by 2010. An important component of the scheme is the Education Guarantee Scheme and Alternative and Innovative Education, meant primarily for children in areas with no formal school within a one-kilometer radius. The centrally sponsored District Primary Education Programme, launched in 1994, had opened more than 160,000 new schools by 2005, including almost 84,000 alternative schools.

Non-governmental efforts

The bulk of Indian illiterates live in the country's rural areas, where social and economic barriers play an important role in keeping the lowest strata of society illiterate. Government programs alone, however well-intentioned, may not be able to dismantle barriers built over centuries. Major social reformation efforts are sometimes required to bring about a change in the rural scenario. Specific mention is to be made regarding the role of the People's Science Movements (PSMs) and Bharat Gyan Vigyan Samiti (BGVS)  in the Literacy Mission in India during the early 1990s.  Several non-governmental organisations such as Pratham, ITC, Rotary Club, Lions Club have worked to improve the literacy rate in India.

Manthan Sampoorna Vikas Kendra

Manthan SVK is a holistic education program initiated by Divya Jyoti Jagriti Sansthan under the guidance of Shri Ashutosh Maharajji. This initiative, started in 2008, has since then reached and spread education to over 5000 underprivileged children across India, with its centers spread in Delhi - NCR, Punjab and Bihar. The main aim of Manthan is to provide not just academic but also mental, physical and emotional education. Manthan has also been working for adult literacy through its Adult Literacy Centres for illiterate women. Vocational education is also given attention to, with Sewing and Stitching Centres for women.

The motto of Manthan being Saakshar Bharat, Sashakt Bharat, it has been providing quality education selflessly.

Mamidipudi Venkatarangaiya Foundation
Shantha Sinha won a Magsaysay Award in 2003 in recognition of "Her guiding the people of Andhra Pradesh to end the scourge of child labor and send all of their children to school." As head of an extension program at the University of Hyderabad in 1987, she organized a three-month-long camp to prepare children rescued from bonded labor to attend school. Later, in 1991, she guided her family's Mamidipudi Venkatarangaiya Foundation to take up this idea as part of its overriding mission in Andhra Pradesh. Her original transition camps grew into full-fledged residential "bridge schools." The foundation's aim is to create a social climate hostile to child labor, child marriage and other practices that deny children the right to a normal childhood. Today the MV Foundation's bridge schools and programs extend to 4,300 villages.

See also
 List of Indian states and union territories by literacy rate
 Literacy
 Education in India
 Kerala model
 National Literacy Mission Programme
 Speech on Education in India by Keshub Chandra Sen delivered at London on 24 May 1870.
 Ekal Vidyalaya, non-profit charity organisation dedicated to education and village development in rural India
 Asha for Education, a non-profit organisation bringing hope through education. 
 Pratham, an NGO with literacy programmes
 PlanetRead, a non-profit organisation using subtitled Bollywood film songs to increase functional literacy
The current population of India is
1.339 billion.
The current literacy rate is 74.04

References

 Sources 

 

Further reading
 Calvi, Rossella, Federico Mantovanelli, and Lauren Hoehn-Velasco. "The Protestant Legacy: Missions and Human Capital in India." (2019) online.
 Chaudhary, Latika, and Manuj Garg. "Does history matter? Colonial education investments in India." Economic History Review 68.3 (2015): 937–961.
 Chaudhary, Latika. "Taxation and educational development: Evidence from British India." Explorations in Economic History 47.3 (2010): 279-293 online.
 Chaudhary, Latika. "Determinants of primary schooling in British India." Journal of Economic History'' (2009): 269-302 online.
 Natarajan, Dandapani. "Extracts from the All India Census Reports on Literacy." (2016) page 11 online

External links

National Literacy Mission
Indian Census
National Literacy Policies – India
Need for literacy in India
Growth of literacy in India
Literacy in the context of constitution of India
Find details about Literacy in India
Literacy as seen in the 2001 census

 Times of India editorial Learn to change, 28 July 2006
The Statesman editorial Institutionalised sub literacy, 22 August 2006
Left behind by Bangladesh – The Telegraph report on 2 October 2005
 Provisional Population Totals for Census 2011  31 March 2011
 India languishes in its villages:NSSO Survey
 India Literacy Project, a catalyst for 100% literacy in India